Mutual Pharmaceutical Co. v. Bartlett, 570 U.S. 472 (2013), is a decision by the Supreme Court of the United States holding that generic drug manufactures cannot be held liable under state law for not adequately labeling medication when federal law prohibits them from changing the label from the original brand name drug.

Legal Background

The Federal Food, Drug and Cosmetic Act (FDCA) requires that all drug manufactures gain approval from the Food and Drug Administration (FDA) before engaging in interstate commerce. When a new brand name drug is created, the drug must be submitted under a New-Drug Application (NDA). In the NDA is a compilation of materials that must include a full report of all clinical investigations and all relevant studies. The NDA may only be approved by the FDA if they find that the drug is safe for use and the therapeutic benefits outweigh the drug's harm.

Because submitting an NDA is expensive and lengthy, the Congress set out to create an easier path for generic drugs to be issued to the public. Congress passed the Drug Price Competition and Patent Term Restoration Act of 1984, known as the Hatch-Waxman Act. Under Hatch-Waxman a generic drug may be approved for use without the onerous provisions of an NDA provided the generic drug is identical to an already approved brand-name drug. Under Hatch-Waxman the generic drug manufacturer is prohibited from making any changes in the drug or from making any changes to the already approved label.

New Hampshire State Law imposes a duty on drug manufactures that the drugs they produce are not unreasonably unsafe. The safety of drugs is to be judged by a combination of its chemical properties and its warning label.

Case Background

In 1978 the FDA approved an anti-inflammatory pain reliever called sulindac under the brand name Clinoril. When the patent expired the FDA approved several generic versions including one manufactured by Mutual Pharmaceutical. The drugs have serious side-effects including hypersensitivity skin reactions with necrosis of the skin, toxic epidermal necrolysis and Stevens–Johnson syndrome.

In 2004 the respondent Karen Bartlett was given Clinoril for shoulder pain. The pharmacist dispensed a generic form made by Mutual Pharmaceutical. Bartlett soon developed toxic epidermal necrolysis with sixty percent of her skin was destroyed. She underwent months in medically induced coma, twelve eye surgeries and was tube fed for a year.

At the time of the incident the label did not specifically refer to developed toxic epidermal necrolysis but did warn of severe skin reactions, however toxic epidermal necrolysis was listed on the package insert

District Court

Bartlett sued in New Hampshire State Court, however Mutual was able to remove the case to Federal District Court. Bartlett initially argued both failure-to-warn and design-defect claims. The District Court dismissed her failure-to-warn claim on her doctor’s own testimony that she had not read the box nor label. On the claim of design-defect a jury found Mutual liable for over $21 million in damages. Mutual appealed.

Appellate Court

The Court of Appeals affirmed the District Court's ruling. It distinguished from an earlier case, PLIVA v. Mensing, in that generic drug makers could simply choose not to make the generic drugs and thus satisfy both State and Federal Laws.

Decision of the Court

The Court reversed the decision of the First Circuit with Justice Alito writing for the majority. The Court centered its opinion around the impossibility of a generic drug manufacturer both meeting its obligations under State law and Federal Law. Where such conflict exists, the court writes, Federal Law must take primacy under the Supremacy Clause.

Dissent

Justice Breyer, joined by Justice Kagan dissented arguing that it was not totally impossible for the drug manufactures to comply with both State and Federal Law. He argued that the company could either choose not to do business in the State of New Hampshire or could accept that such damages are a cost of doing business.

Justice Sotomayor, joined by Justice Ginsburg also dissented arguing that the majority had removed Mutual from the reach of common law liability. She also argued that Federal drug law should be looked at as complementary to State laws, rather than in competition with them.

References

External links
 

United States Supreme Court cases
United States Supreme Court cases of the Roberts Court
United States Sixth Amendment case law
2013 in United States case law